Calisto batesi is a butterfly of the family Nymphalidae. It is endemic to Hispaniola.

The larvae feed on various grasses.

Taxonomy
It was formerly treated as a subspecies of Calisto hysius.

References

Butterflies described in 1943
Calisto (butterfly)